The 2005 NAIA football season was the component of the 2005 college football season organized by the National Association of Intercollegiate Athletics (NAIA) in the United States. The season's playoffs, known as the NAIA Football National Championship, culminated with the championship game on December 17, at Jim Carroll Stadium in Savannah, Tennessee. The Carroll Fighting Saints defeated the Saint Francis Cougars, 27–10, in the title game to win the program's fourth consecutive NAIA championship.

Conference standings

Postseason

Rankings

References